Sidney De Paris (May 30, 1905 – September 13, 1967) was an American jazz trumpeter. His brother was Wilbur de Paris.

He was a member of Charlie Johnson's Paradise Ten (1926–1931), worked with Don Redman (1932–1936 and 1939), followed by periods with Zutty Singleton (1939–1941), Benny Carter (1940–41), and Art Hodes (1941). De Paris recorded with Jelly Roll Morton (1939) and Sidney Bechet (1940),  and was part of the Panassie sessions in 1938. From 1947, and throughout the 1950s, he performed almost exclusively with his brother, Wilbur. 

He suffered from ill health in the latter years of his life, before he died in September 1967, at the age of 62.

Partial discography 
 "I've Found A New Baby" b/w "Black And Blue" - Commodore Records 78 rpm 552 (1940s) - as De Paris Brothers Orchestra featuring Wilbur de Paris, with Edmond Hall, Clyde Hart, Billy Taylor and Specs Powell
 Deparis Dixie (Blue Note, 1944)
 Jamming in Jazz (Blue Note, 1944)
 Sidney Deparis' Blue Note Stompers (Blue Note, 1951)
 Dixieland Hits Country & Western (Swingville, 1962)

References

External links
 Scott Yanow, [ Sidney DeParis] at AllMusic

1905 births
1967 deaths
Dixieland trumpeters
American jazz trumpeters
American male trumpeters
Musicians from Indiana
Blue Note Records artists
20th-century American musicians
20th-century trumpeters
20th-century American male musicians
American male jazz musicians